An election to the Neath Rural District Council in West Glamorgan, Wales was held on 1 April 1946. It was preceded by the 1937 election, as no elections had been held 1940 and 1943 due to the Second World War, and followed by the 1949 election.

Overview of the results
Having won control of the authority for the first time in 1934, Labour consolidated their position by winning a number of additional seats across the area with the Independent group, which previously controlled the authority, reduced to only six members.

Candidates
Labour, who had maintained a majority of seats on the Council since 1934, nominated almost a full slate of candidates; seven of whom were returned unpposed. 

A smaller number of Independent candidates stood than in previous years, although their number was boosted by Mary Elizabeth Davies, originally a Labour councillor at Coedffranc who had been elected as Independent Labour in 1937. She now stood as a non-party candidate. British Legion candidates contested both Coedffranc and Resolven. There were also a number of Communist candidates, including Alun Thomas who had recently taken the Coedffranc county council seat from Labour.

Outcome
The outcome of the election saw a mixed picture as Labour gained seats from the Independents, but the chairman of the Council Council, John James, was defeated at Onllwyn by a Communist candidate. Alun Thomas successfully defended his seat at Dyffryn Clydach, where Labour took the second seat an Independent. At Seven Sisters, Labour also gained a seat from the Independents, although Communist candidate Evan Lewis came within 64 votes of defeating the veteran Labour councillor, George Jones.

A notable feature was the success of British Legion candidates at Coedffranc and Resolven. Significantly, the result at Coedffranc echoed a precedent in 1919 when an ex-serviceman was elected in the same ward.

Ward Results

Baglan Higher (one seat)

Blaengwrach (one seats)

Blaenrhonddan (three seats)

Clyne (one seats)

Coedffranc (five seats)

Dyffryn Clydach (two seats)

Dulais Higher, Crynant Ward (one seat)

Dulais Higher, Onllwyn Ward (one seat)

Dulais Higher, Seven Sisters Ward (two seats)

Dulais Lower (one seat)

Michaelstone Higher (one seat)

Neath Higher (three seats)

Neath Lower (one seat)

Resolven, Cwmgwrach Ward (one seat)

Resolven, Resolven Ward (two seats)

Resolven, Rhigos Ward (two seats)

Resolven, Tonna Ward (one seat)

References

1946 Welsh local elections